A guest host (or guest presenter in the United Kingdom) is a host, usually of a talk show, that hosts the program in lieu of the regular host if they fall ill, have another project or commitment, or are unable to host for some other reason.

Guest hosts may be seen as undesirable for a show's producer if they have to be used for an extended period of time, but if they do a well enough job, the guest host may often be able to parlay their run into their own talk show or other project.

History

The Tonight Show
This phrase was popularized on The Tonight Show during Johnny Carson's 30-year reign as host from 1962 to 1992. Toward the end of his tenure, Carson was granted more personal time off, and substitute hosts would be seen on the air more often.

Some guest hosts of The Tonight Show have gone on to host talk shows of their own. Jay Leno would eventually succeed Johnny Carson as Tonight Show host; David Letterman went on to host Late Night with David Letterman in the time slot following Carson; Joan Rivers went on to host The Late Show Starring Joan Rivers on Fox; early Carson guest host Joey Bishop went on to host The Joey Bishop Show on rival ABC, and David Brenner hosted the short-lived Nightlife in the late-1980s.  Richard Belzer hosted Hot Properties on the Lifetime network in the mid-1980s. Carson himself had earlier been a guest host on Tonight Starring Jack Paar.

The Late Show with David Letterman
The Late Show with David Letterman featured several weeks of guest hosts substituting for David Letterman throughout the 2000s while Letterman recovered from a quintuple bypass surgery and shingles.

The View
The View first became popular with the guest host format in between the arrivals and departures of the program's youngest co-hosts, Debbie Matenopoulos, Lisa Ling, and Elisabeth Hasselbeck. Although a variety of celebrities took turns in the chair, only the younger co-hosts were eligible for the job. During its tenth season, The View began featuring a guest host each day; regular Barbara Walters did not appear with anybody yet was considered eligible to replace Star Jones, who left the previous year. Following the departure of Rosie O'Donnell in 2007 the program looked to return to a panel of five women. The moderator role was given to comedian Whoopi Goldberg in August and Jones' role was given to actress and comedian Sherri Shepherd the week following Goldberg's debut. The View used the guest host format in place of Elisabeth Hasselbeck in 2009 while she was on maternity leave.

Jeopardy!
Following the death of longtime host, Alex Trebek, in November 2020, Jeopardy! had a guest host format until a permanent host could be found. Those included past Jeopardy! champions Ken Jennings and Buzzy Cohen, executive producer Mike Richards, television news personalities Katie Couric, Bill Whitaker, Savannah Guthrie, Sanjay Gupta, Anderson Cooper George Stephanopoulos and Robin Roberts, Aaron Rodgers of the Green Bay Packers, talk show host Mehmet Oz, actress and neuroscientist Mayim Bialik, Reading Rainbow host LeVar Burton, Squawk on the Street co-host David Faber and ESPN broadcaster Joe Buck. Richards would be announced as the permanent host at season's end, with Bialik being taken on as a host for primetime tournaments airing on ABC. Michaels was soon fired due to past personal conduct issues and self-dealing allegations regarding his intervention making the host search pointless. Currently, the daily version of the show is currently hosted on a rotation by Bialik (when available due to commitments for her sitcom, Call Me Kat) and Jennings.

Jimmy Kimmel Live
At the end of June 2020 and in the wake of the COVID-19 pandemic, Jimmy Kimmel decided to take time off from his late night talk show Jimmy Kimmel Live! in July and August 2020 to spend more time with his family and prepare for hosting the 72nd Primetime Emmy Awards. He has since continued a break from hosting in those months before the start of the television season in September as a summer tradition, with guest hosts including Anthony Anderson and Chelsea Handler a part of the yearly rotation. Previously Kimmel has taken time off and had guest hosts as he dealt with personal health matters, including complications from the birth and development of his younger son.

Other guest host examples
Saturday Night Live was intended originally to have a permanent host, but launched with a guest host format that continues to the present day.
Ellen: Ellen DeGeneres's show had more guest hosts in its last few seasons, and her show's musical director/DJ Stephen "tWitch" Boss regularly hosted each week's Friday show.
Live with Kelly and Ryan:  the show features guest hosts (usually television or Broadway theater actors) when either Ryan Seacrest or Kelly Ripa is away, with comedian Ali Wentworth (wife of George Stephanopoulos, the host of sister program Good Morning America) a long-time part of the rotation. Ripa's husband, Mark Consuelos, also co-hosts with his wife often.
Later:  After Greg Kinnear left the program in 1996 for a film career, NBC's late night talk show went to a "guest host of the week" format featuring mostly young comedians and actors for two years before settling on Cynthia Garrett in 1998.
The Late Show Starring Joan Rivers: After Joan Rivers was fired by Fox in 1988, The Late Show adopted a format consisting only of guest hosts.  One of them, Arsenio Hall, went on to host The Arsenio Hall Show, which lasted 1989 to 1994.
Late Late Show:  In late 2004, between Craig Kilborn's departure and Craig Ferguson's hiring to CBS's Late Late Show, Late Late rotated through several guest hosts, including Jim Rome, Susan Sarandon and Tim Robbins, David Alan Grier, Ana Gasteyer, Drew Carey, Michael Ian Black, and Craig Ferguson. This format was used again during between the transition from Craig Ferguson to James Corden in the winter of 2015, and for a couple weeks in December 2019 while Corden was on a publicity tour for his appearance in the film adaptation of Cats.
The Rosie O'Donnell Show:  Rosie O'Donnell also used the format during the final season of her own talk show. Comedian Caroline Rhea was given the role of permanent guest host when receiving growing popularity for hosting when O'Donnell was on sick leave the previous year. Following O'Donnell's return, Rhea hosted every Friday edition of the program until it went off the air.  Like Joan Rivers with the Tonight Show, Rhea went on to host her own talk show the following year.  It, too, was cancelled after only one season.
The Kelly Clarkson Show: Jay Leno has hosted several episodes of the talk show when Kelly Clarkson has other commitments for NBCUniversal or her music career, including The Voice and her 2021 Christmas album and special.
The Wendy Williams Show: Despite Williams insisting she would never allow a guest host, actor Jerry O'Connell filled in for her several times dating back to March 2018 due to illness or personal issues, and hosted a summer test run of a talk show from the same studio for Fox Television Stations that was considered for syndication in the 2021-22 season. Though he did not get that show, he became a co-host on The Talk for CBS in the summer of 2021, along with hosting the fall 2022 game show Pictionary. Guest hosts hosted the thirteenth season as Williams dealt with continuous medical issues, refusing to do further 'at home' editions as she saw them as lower quality after a short run doing so. Sherri Shepherd was named the permanent guest host in February 2022 for the remainder of the season, and the show ended in June 2022 with Shepherd launching a new self-titled show with the same distributors and most of the existing crew in the same time slot in the fall of 2022, as Williams never recovered. The latter move has proven to be controversial to Williams' fanbase, though was required as the show's distributor and station base has asked for clarity and stability in their marketing of the series.
The Daily Show: After Trevor Noah stepped down as host in December 2022, it was announced that the show would use guest hosts in 2023 until Comedy Central officially picked a new host, including Leslie Jones, Wanda Sykes, D.L. Hughley, Chelsea Handler, Sarah Silverman, Al Franken, John Leguizamo, former Daily Show correspondent Hasan Minhaj, Kal Penn, and Marlon Wayans.

United Kingdom
In the United Kingdom, some shows have guest presenters on a permanent basis. Have I Got News for You has used a different guest presenter for each show since Angus Deayton's departure in 2002. On The Jack Docherty Show in the late 1990s, Jack Docherty was absent so often that the show (retitled Not the Jack Docherty Show) more often than not had a fill-in. When Simon Amstell left his role on Never Mind the Buzzcocks, guest hosts took over the role to December 2013, not unlike a similar incident during Series 18.

Other uses
The frequency of guest presenters on certain shows has been parodied by the Onion News Network's Clifford Banes character, who never presents his show for a variety of absurd reasons, and is always replaced by a guest presenter.
The main plot device of the ESPN Classic series Cheap Seats is that "tape librarians" Randy & Jason Sklar are guest hosting the series while the actual host Ron Parker (an in-universe parody of an overly vain SportsCenter anchor played by Michael Showalter) is rehabilitating from the collapse of tape shelving onto him in the show's pilot, a recovery that takes the entire series' four season, 79-episode run. The series' full title is facetiously Cheap Seats: Without Ron Parker.
Daytime syndicated talk shows of the 1960s and 1970s most often featured a celebrity guest hosting the show alongside the show's host—most notable of these is The Mike Douglas Show.
 World Wrestling Entertainment had weekly guest hosts (either celebrities, WWE Hall of Famers and injured or retired wrestlers) as kayfabe bookers on their flagship show Monday Night Raw.

References

See also
Cameo appearance
Guest appearance

Radio broadcasting
Television terminology